The 2003–04 Pittsburgh Penguins season was the team's 37th season of play. For the third season in a row, the club placed last in the Atlantic Division and did not qualify for the Stanley Cup playoffs. In an 18-game losing streak, they went 0–17–1 (one overtime loss). In the first 62 games, they were 11–42–5–4 for 31 points. In their final 20 games, they were 12–5–3–0, ultimately finishing with a 23–47–8–4 record for a last place finish. Their record losing streak would not be matched until the pandemic-shortened 2020–21 season by the Buffalo Sabres. By then, tie games would be out of the picture.

Offseason
Head coach Rick Kehoe was fired on April 15, 2003. Team broadcaster and former Penguins player Eddie Olczyk was hired as his replacement on June 11.

Regular season
The Penguins struggled defensively, finishing 30th overall in the NHL in goals allowed, with 303. They struggled in short-handed situations, allowing the most power-play goals in the League, with 84, and finishing 30th overall in penalty-kill percentage, at 77.24%. Furthermore, they allowed the most short-handed goals in the NHL, with 15.

Final standings

Schedule and results

|-  style="background:#fcf;"
| 1 || 10 || Los Angeles Kings || 3–0 || Pittsburgh Penguins || Civic Arena (16,986) || 0–1–0–0 || 0 || 
|-  style="background:#fff;"
| 2 || 11 || Pittsburgh Penguins || 3–3 OT || Philadelphia Flyers || Wells Fargo Center (19,035) || 0–1–1–0 || 1 || 
|-  style="background:#fcf;"
| 3 || 16 || Pittsburgh Penguins || 1–4 || Montreal Canadiens || Bell Centre (18,859) || 0–2–1–0 || 1 || 
|-  style="background:#cfc;"
| 4 || 18 || Detroit Red Wings || 3–4 || Pittsburgh Penguins || Civic Arena (13,421) || 1–2–1–0 || 3 || 
|-  style="background:#fff;"
| 5 || 22 || Carolina Hurricanes || 1–1 OT || Pittsburgh Penguins || Civic Arena (10,425) || 1–2–2–0 || 4 || 
|-  style="background:#fcf;"
| 6 || 24 || New Jersey Devils || 2–1 || Pittsburgh Penguins || Civic Arena (11,281) || 1–3–2–0 || 4 || 
|-  style="background:#fcf;"
| 7 || 25 || Pittsburgh Penguins || 2–7 || New York Islanders || Nassau Coliseum (11,746) || 1–4–2–0 || 4 || 
|-  style="background:#fff;"
| 8 || 29 || New York Islanders || 4–4 OT || Pittsburgh Penguins || Civic Arena (10,377) || 1–4–3–0 || 5 || 
|-  style="background:#cfc;"
| 9 || 30 || Pittsburgh Penguins || 1–0 || Chicago Blackhawks || United Center (15,121) || 2–4–3–0 || 7 || 
|-

|-  style="background:#cfc;"
| 10 || 1 || Boston Bruins || 2–3 OT || Pittsburgh Penguins || Civic Arena (10,226) || 3–4–3–0 || 9 || 
|-  style="background:#fcf;"
| 11 || 4 || Pittsburgh Penguins || 2–4 || Toronto Maple Leafs || Air Canada Centre (19,237) || 3–5–3–0 || 9 || 
|-  style="background:#fcf;"
| 12 || 7 || Pittsburgh Penguins || 3–6 || Florida Panthers || BB&T Center (18,161) || 3–6–3–0 || 9 || 
|-  style="background:#fcf;"
| 13 || 8 || Pittsburgh Penguins || 0–9 || Tampa Bay Lightning || Amalie Arena (18,262) || 3–7–3–0 || 9 || 
|-  style="background:#fcf;"
| 14 || 12 || Pittsburgh Penguins || 2–6 || New York Rangers || Madison Square Garden (17,960) || 3–8–3–0 || 9 || 
|-  style="background:#cfc;"
| 15 || 14 || Pittsburgh Penguins || 2–1 OT || Buffalo Sabres || First Niagara Center (18,002) || 4–8–3–0 || 11 || 
|-  style="background:#fcf;"
| 16 || 15 || Florida Panthers || 3–2 || Pittsburgh Penguins || Civic Arena (11,004) || 4–9–3–0 || 11 || 
|-  style="background:#fcf;"
| 17 || 19 || Minnesota Wild || 6–2 || Pittsburgh Penguins || Civic Arena (10,957) || 4–10–3–0 || 11 || 
|-  style="background:#ffc;"
| 18 || 21 || Pittsburgh Penguins || 1–2 OT || New Jersey Devils || Izod Center (16,810) || 4–10–3–1 || 12 || 
|-  style="background:#cfc;"
| 19 || 22 || Ottawa Senators || 1–2 OT || Pittsburgh Penguins || Civic Arena (11,233) || 5–10–3–1 || 14 || 
|-  style="background:#fff;"
| 20 || 26 || Philadelphia Flyers || 1–1 OT || Pittsburgh Penguins || Civic Arena (11,014) || 5–10–4–1 || 15 || 
|-  style="background:#fcf;"
| 21 || 28 || New York Rangers || 4–1 || Pittsburgh Penguins || Civic Arena (15,908) || 5–11–4–1 || 15 || 
|-  style="background:#fcf;"
| 22 || 29 || Pittsburgh Penguins || 3–4 || Carolina Hurricanes || PNC Arena (14,881) || 5–12–4–1 || 15 || 
|-

|-  style="background:#cfc;"
| 23 || 1 || Atlanta Thrashers || 3–4 || Pittsburgh Penguins || Civic Arena (9,576) || 6–12–4–1 || 17 || 
|-  style="background:#fcf;"
| 24 || 3 || Pittsburgh Penguins || 2–5 || Philadelphia Flyers || Wells Fargo Center (18,972) || 6–13–4–1 || 17 || 
|-  style="background:#fcf;"
| 25 || 6 || Pittsburgh Penguins || 3–4 || Edmonton Oilers || Skyreach Centre (16,839) || 6–14–4–1 || 17 || 
|-  style="background:#fcf;"
| 26 || 7 || Pittsburgh Penguins || 1–6 || Calgary Flames || Scotiabank Saddledome (15,009) || 6–15–4–1 || 17 || 
|-  style="background:#ffc;"
| 27 || 9 || Pittsburgh Penguins || 3–4 OT || Vancouver Canucks || Rogers Arena (18,630) || 6–15–4–2 || 18 || 
|-  style="background:#fcf;"
| 28 || 12 || Pittsburgh Penguins || 3–6 || Atlanta Thrashers || Philips Arena (15,039) || 6–16–4–2 || 18 || 
|-  style="background:#cfc;"
| 29 || 13 || Columbus Blue Jackets || 3–5 || Pittsburgh Penguins || Civic Arena (11,989) || 7–16–4–2 || 20 || 
|-  style="background:#cfc;"
| 30 || 16 || Buffalo Sabres || 1–2 || Pittsburgh Penguins || Civic Arena (10,554) || 8–16–4–2 || 22 || 
|-  style="background:#ffc;"
| 31 || 18 || Pittsburgh Penguins || 1–2 OT || Carolina Hurricanes || PNC Arena (11,028) || 8–16–4–3 || 23 || 
|-  style="background:#fcf;"
| 32 || 20 || Atlanta Thrashers || 7–4 || Pittsburgh Penguins || Civic Arena (13,683) || 8–17–4–3 || 23 || 
|-  style="background:#fcf;"
| 33 || 22 || Pittsburgh Penguins || 1–4 || Montreal Canadiens || Bell Centre (21,273) || 8–18–4–3 || 23 || 
|-  style="background:#fff;"
| 34 || 26 || Pittsburgh Penguins || 3–3 OT || Ottawa Senators || Canadian Tire Centre (18,316) || 8–18–5–3 || 24 || 
|-  style="background:#fcf;"
| 35 || 27 || New Jersey Devils || 2–0 || Pittsburgh Penguins || Civic Arena (12,139) || 8–19–5–3 || 24 || 
|-  style="background:#cfc;"
| 36 || 29 || Chicago Blackhawks || 0–1 || Pittsburgh Penguins || Civic Arena (16,120) || 9–19–5–3 || 26 || 
|-  style="background:#fcf;"
| 37 || 31 || New York Islanders || 6–1 || Pittsburgh Penguins || Civic Arena (11,939) || 9–20–5–3 || 26 || 
|-

|-  style="background:#fcf;"
| 38 || 1 || Pittsburgh Penguins || 2–3 || Nashville Predators || Bridgestone Arena (16,238) || 9–21–5–3 || 26 || 
|-  style="background:#fcf;"
| 39 || 3 || New York Rangers || 4–1 || Pittsburgh Penguins || Civic Arena (10,078) || 9–22–5–3 || 26 || 
|-  style="background:#fcf;"
| 40 || 5 || Toronto Maple Leafs || 5–0 || Pittsburgh Penguins || Civic Arena (10,216) || 9–23–5–3 || 26 || 
|-  style="background:#cfc;"
| 41 || 7 || Pittsburgh Penguins || 4–2 || New Jersey Devils || Izod Center (11,948) || 10–23–5–3 || 28 || 
|-  style="background:#fcf;"
| 42 || 8 || Pittsburgh Penguins || 1–3 || Boston Bruins || TD Garden (12,914) || 10–24–5–3 || 28 || 
|-  style="background:#fcf;"
| 43 || 10 || Montreal Canadiens || 8–0 || Pittsburgh Penguins || Civic Arena (15,286) || 10–25–5–3 || 28 || 
|-  style="background:#cfc;"
| 44 || 12 || Pittsburgh Penguins || 2–1 || Philadelphia Flyers || Wells Fargo Center (19,542) || 11–25–5–3 || 30 || 
|-  style="background:#fcf;"
| 45 || 13 || Tampa Bay Lightning || 3–1 || Pittsburgh Penguins || Civic Arena (10,039) || 11–26–5–3 || 30 || 
|-  style="background:#fcf;"
| 46 || 16 || Pittsburgh Penguins || 2–4 || Minnesota Wild || Xcel Energy Center (18,568) || 11–27–5–3 || 30 || 
|-  style="background:#fcf;"
| 47 || 18 || Pittsburgh Penguins || 3–4 || Washington Capitals || Verizon Center (16,168) || 11–28–5–3 || 30 || 
|-  style="background:#fcf;"
| 48 || 20 || New Jersey Devils || 3–0 || Pittsburgh Penguins || Civic Arena (10,146) || 11–29–5–3 || 30 || 
|-  style="background:#fcf;"
| 49 || 22 || Pittsburgh Penguins || 5–6 || Ottawa Senators || Canadian Tire Centre (16,777) || 11–30–5–3 || 30 || 
|-  style="background:#fcf;"
| 50 || 24 || Colorado Avalanche || 5–3 || Pittsburgh Penguins || Civic Arena (16,704) || 11–31–5–3 || 30 || 
|-  style="background:#fcf;"
| 51 || 27 || Tampa Bay Lightning || 6–2 || Pittsburgh Penguins || Civic Arena (9,391) || 11–32–5–3 || 30 || 
|-  style="background:#fcf;"
| 52 || 29 || Pittsburgh Penguins || 1–5 || Tampa Bay Lightning || Amalie Arena (15,847) || 11–33–5–3 || 30 || 
|-  style="background:#fcf;"
| 53 || 31 || Philadelphia Flyers || 5–3 || Pittsburgh Penguins || Civic Arena (12,965) || 11–34–5–3 || 30 || 
|-

|-  style="background:#fcf;"
| 54 || 1 || Pittsburgh Penguins || 1–4 || Boston Bruins || TD Garden (15,692) || 11–35–5–3 || 30 || 
|-  style="background:#fcf;"
| 55 || 3 || Montreal Canadiens || 4–3 || Pittsburgh Penguins || Civic Arena (10,041) || 11–36–5–3 || 30 || 
|-  style="background:#fcf;"
| 56 || 10 || Boston Bruins || 6–3 || Pittsburgh Penguins || Civic Arena (10,741) || 11–37–5–3 || 30 || 
|-  style="background:#fcf;"
| 57 || 12 || Pittsburgh Penguins || 1–5 || Florida Panthers || BB&T Center (15,863) || 11–38–5–3 || 30 || 
|-  style="background:#ffc;"
| 58 || 14 || Pittsburgh Penguins || 2–3 OT || St. Louis Blues || Scottrade Center (19,812) || 11–38–5–4 || 31 || 
|-  style="background:#fcf;"
| 59 || 16 || Toronto Maple Leafs || 8–4 || Pittsburgh Penguins || Civic Arena (10,527) || 11–39–5–4 || 31 || 
|-  style="background:#fcf;"
| 60 || 18 || Pittsburgh Penguins || 3–4 || New York Islanders || Nassau Coliseum (13,570) || 11–40–5–4 || 31 || 
|-  style="background:#fcf;"
| 61 || 20 || Florida Panthers || 2–0 || Pittsburgh Penguins || Civic Arena (11,917) || 11–41–5–4 || 31 || 
|-  style="background:#fcf;"
| 62 || 22 || Ottawa Senators || 6–3 || Pittsburgh Penguins || Civic Arena (11,780) || 11–42–5–4 || 31 || 
|-  style="background:#cfc;"
| 63 || 25 || Pittsburgh Penguins || 4–3 OT || Phoenix Coyotes || America West Arena (14,712) || 12–42–5–4 || 33 || 
|-  style="background:#fcf;"
| 64 || 27 || Pittsburgh Penguins || 2–4 || San Jose Sharks || SAP Center at San Jose (17,496) || 12–43–5–4 || 33 || 
|-  style="background:#cfc;"
| 65 || 29 || Pittsburgh Penguins || 3–2 OT || New York Islanders || Nassau Coliseum (15,218) || 13–43–5–4 || 35 || 
|-

|-  style="background:#fff;"
| 66 || 2 || New York Islanders || 3–3 OT || Pittsburgh Penguins || Civic Arena (10,821) || 13–43–6–4 || 36 || 
|-  style="background:#fcf;"
| 67 || 4 || Nashville Predators || 9–4 || Pittsburgh Penguins || Civic Arena (9,507) || 13–44–6–4 || 36 || 
|-  style="background:#cfc;"
| 68 || 6 || Mighty Ducks of Anaheim || 1–2 || Pittsburgh Penguins || Civic Arena (14,286) || 14–44–6–4 || 38 || 
|-  style="background:#cfc;"
| 69 || 7 || Pittsburgh Penguins || 7–4 || New York Rangers || Madison Square Garden (18,200) || 15–44–6–4 || 40 || 
|-  style="background:#cfc;"
| 70 || 9 || Dallas Stars || 0–4 || Pittsburgh Penguins || Civic Arena (10,302) || 16–44–6–4 || 42 || 
|-  style="background:#cfc;"
| 71 || 11 || Pittsburgh Penguins || 3–2 || Toronto Maple Leafs || Air Canada Centre (19,411) || 17–44–6–4 || 44 || 
|-  style="background:#fff;"
| 72 || 14 || Philadelphia Flyers || 3–3 OT || Pittsburgh Penguins || Civic Arena (10,907) || 17–44–7–4 || 45 || 
|-  style="background:#cfc;"
| 73 || 16 || Washington Capitals || 1–4 || Pittsburgh Penguins || Civic Arena (10,982) || 18–44–7–4 || 47 || 
|-  style="background:#fcf;"
| 74 || 17 || Pittsburgh Penguins || 1–6 || New Jersey Devils || Izod Center (13,239) || 18–45–7–4 || 47 || 
|-  style="background:#cfc;"
| 75 || 19 || Carolina Hurricanes || 3–4 OT || Pittsburgh Penguins || Civic Arena (10,098) || 19–45–7–4 || 49 || 
|-  style="background:#cfc;"
| 76 || 21 || New York Rangers || 3–4 OT || Pittsburgh Penguins || Civic Arena (12,307) || 20–45–7–4 || 51 || 
|-  style="background:#cfc;"
| 77 || 23 || Pittsburgh Penguins || 5–2 || New York Rangers || Madison Square Garden (17,902) || 21–45–7–4 || 53 || 
|-  style="background:#fcf;"
| 78 || 26 || Pittsburgh Penguins || 1–5 || Buffalo Sabres || First Niagara Center (18,333) || 21–46–7–4 || 53 || 
|-  style="background:#fff;"
| 79 || 27 || Buffalo Sabres || 2–2 OT || Pittsburgh Penguins || Civic Arena (12,964) || 21–46–8–4 || 54 || 
|-  style="background:#fcf;"
| 80 || 30 || Pittsburgh Penguins || 2–4 || Washington Capitals || Verizon Center (13,417) || 21–47–8–4 || 54 || 
|-

|-  style="background:#cfc;"
| 81 || 2 || Pittsburgh Penguins || 3–2 || Atlanta Thrashers || Philips Arena (18,854) || 22–47–8–4 || 56 || 
|-  style="background:#cfc;"
| 82 || 4 || Washington Capitals || 3–4 || Pittsburgh Penguins || Civic Arena (16,124) || 23–47–8–4 || 58 || 
|-

|- style="text-align:center;"
| Legend:       = Win       = Loss       = OT Loss       = Tie

Player statistics

Scoring
 Position abbreviations: C = Center; D = Defense; G = Goaltender; LW = Left Wing; RW = Right Wing
  = Joined team via a transaction (e.g., trade, waivers, signing) during the season. Stats reflect time with the Penguins only.
  = Left team via a transaction (e.g., trade, waivers, release) during the season. Stats reflect time with the Penguins only.

Goaltending

Awards and records

Awards

Records
The team also set the NHL record for longest home losing streak, with 14 home losses.

Transactions
The Penguins were involved in the following transactions from June 10, 2003, the day after the deciding game of the 2003 Stanley Cup Finals, through June 7, 2004, the day of the deciding game of the 2004 Stanley Cup Finals.

Trades

Players acquired

Players lost

Signings

Other

Draft picks
Pittsburgh had 11 picks in the 2003 NHL Entry Draft.

Draft notes
 The Florida Panthers' first-round pick went to the Pittsburgh Penguins as a result of a June 21, 2003 trade that sent a 2003 first-round pick and a 2003 second round pick to the Panthers in exchange for a 2003 third-round pick and this pick.
 The Penguins' first-round pick went to the Florida Panthers as the result of a June 21, 2003 trade that sent a 2003 first-round pick and a 2003 third-round pick to the Penguins in exchange for Mikael Samuelsson, a 2003 first-round pick and this pick.
 The Penguins' third-round pick went to the Florida Panthers as the result of a June 21, 2003 trade that sent a 2003 first-round pick and a 2003 third-round pick to the Penguins in exchange for Mikael Samuelsson, a 2003 first-round pick and this pick.
 The Florida Panthers' third-round pick went to the Pittsburgh Penguins as a result of a June 21, 2003 trade that sent Mikael Samuelsson, a 2003 first-round pick and a 2003 second round pick to the Panthers in exchange for a 2003 first-round pick and this pick.
 The Penguins' fourth-round pick went to the Columbus Blue Jackets as the result of a March 15, 2002 trade that sent Jamie Pushor to the Penguins in exchange for this pick.
 The Boston Bruins' fourth-round pick went to the Pittsburgh Penguins as a result of a March 11, 2003 trade that sent Ian Moran the Bruins in exchange for this pick.
 The Penguins' fifth-round pick went to the San Jose Sharks as the result of a February 9, 2003 trade that sent Shawn Heins to the Penguins in exchange for this conditional pick.
 The New York Islanders' fifth-round pick (from Philadelphia Flyers) went to the Pittsburgh Penguins as a result of a March 9, 2003 trade that sent Randy Robitaille the Islanders in exchange for this pick.
 The New Jersey Devils' seventh-round pick went to the Pittsburgh Penguins as a result of a March 19, 2002 trade that sent Stephane Richer to the Devils in exchange for this pick.

Farm teams
The AHL's Wilkes-Barre/Scranton Penguins finished third in the East Division with a 34–28–10–8 record.  They defeated the Bridgeport Sound Tigers, Philadelphia Phantoms and the Hartford Wolf Pack to win the Richard F. Canning Trophy as Eastern Conference Champions.  They were swept by the Milwaukee Admirals in the Calder Cup Finals.

The ECHL's Wheeling Nailers won the Northern Division and the Eastern Conference with a record of 51–17–4. They lost to the Reading Royals in the first round of the playoffs. Pat Bingham won the John Brophy Award as the ECHL's coach of the year.

See also
2003–04 NHL season

Notes

References

 
 

Pitts
Pitts
Pittsburgh Penguins seasons
Pitts
Pitts